Sue E. Holbert (born 1935) was an American archivist with the Minnesota Historical Society and the Minnesota State Archivist (1979–1993). She is now the owner of Booklady Used and Rare Books in Chicago, Illinois.

Career
After working in the Minnesota Historical Society's publications division, in 1972 she became an archivist there. In 1979, she became the Minnesota State Archivist. Professionally, she was also a member of the Society of American Archivists (SAA) council (1981–1985), chair of SAA's Government Records Section (1980–1981), and SAA President (1987–1988). In 1983, she was elected as a fellow of SAA. Holbert also served as deputy coordinator of the Minnesota State Historical Records Advisory Board from 1978 to 1988 and also headed the State Coordinators' Steering Committee (1985–1986).

Publications
In 1977, she wrote Archives & Manuscripts: Reference & Access, part of the SAA basic manual series. She also wrote the chapter Women in the Minnesota Legislature in Women of Minnesota: Selected Biographical Essays.

References

External links
Archives & manuscripts, reference & access Chicago : Society of American Archivists, 1977

Female archivists
Presidents of the Society of American Archivists
1935 births
Living people
Businesspeople from Chicago
Minnesota Historical Society